Novoslobidka (literally, New Sloboda) is a village (a selo) in the Zaporizhzhia Raion (district) of Zaporizhzhia Oblast in southern Ukraine. Its population was 548 in the 2001 Ukrainian Census.

The settlement was first founded in 1859 as Rosengarten  by German-speaking Mennonites settling the Chortitza Colony; it was renamed to Novoslobidka in 1920. Administratively, it belongs to the Dolynske Rural Council, a local government area. It is located west of the Khortytskyi District of the city of Zaporizhzhia, the oblast's administrative center.

See also
 History of German settlement in Central and Eastern Europe

References

Populated places established in 1859
German communities in Ukraine
Former German settlements in Zaporizhzhia Oblast

Zaporizhzhia Raion
Villages in Zaporizhzhia Raion